Fox Animation Studios was an American animation production company owned by 20th Century Fox and located in Phoenix, Arizona. After six years of operation, the studio was shut down on June 26, 2000, ten days after the release of its final film, Titan A.E.. Most of the Fox Animation Studios library was acquired by Disney (via 20th Century Studios) on March 20, 2019. Anastasia is the studio's most critically praised and commercially successful film, as well as the most commercially successful film by Don Bluth.

History

Founding 
After the financially unsuccessful release of the Don Bluth Entertainment-produced film Thumbelina on March 30, 1994, animators Don Bluth and Gary Goldman were hired by Bill Mechanic, then-chairman of 20th Century Fox, to create a brand new Fox animation studio. Mechanic and John Matoian, president of Fox Family Films, also brought in Stephen Brain (Executive VP at Silver Pictures) as Senior VP/General Manager to oversee the startup of the studio and run day-to-day operations of the division.

The company was designed to compete with Walt Disney Feature Animation (owned by The Walt Disney Company – which would later acquire certain Fox assets on March 20, 2019), which had phenomenal success during the late 1980s and early 1990s with the releases of films such as The Little Mermaid (1989), Beauty and the Beast (1991), Aladdin (1992) and The Lion King (1994). Disney veterans Bluth and Goldman came in 1994 to Fox from Sullivan Bluth Studios, which had produced The Secret of NIMH (1982), An American Tail (1986), The Land Before Time (1988), and All Dogs Go to Heaven (1989), among other films.

Before Bluth came to Fox, the studio distributed three animated features during the 1990s which were produced by outside studios – FernGully: The Last Rainforest (1992), Once Upon a Forest (1993) and The Pagemaster (1994), the last two of which were both commercial and critical failures. Even before, Fox distributed Hugo the Hippo (1975) by William Feigenbaum and József Gémes, two Ralph Bakshi features, Wizards (1977) and Fire and Ice (1983), as well as Raggedy Ann & Andy: A Musical Adventure (1977) by Richard Williams. Also, Fox distributed Asterix Conquers America (1994) in France and the United Kingdom.

Productions 
Fox Animation Studios did not achieve the same level of success as Disney's animated crop, due to increased competition from Pixar and DreamWorks Animation, the declining revenues of the Disney Renaissance, and the rise of computer-generated animation. The films used digital ink and paint similar to what Disney did with the CAPS software. The studio's first theatrical release Anastasia (1997) found critical and box-office success, but their second and final theatrical release Titan A.E. (2000) got mixed reviews and was a costly flop, losing $100 million for 20th Century Fox. Nearly a year before its closure, 20th Century Fox laid off 300 of the nearly 380 people who worked at the Phoenix studio in order to "make films more efficiently".

Shutdown 
On June 26, 2000, the studio was shut down after six years of operation, resulting from poor financial returns. Their last film set to be made would have been an adaptation of Wayne Barlowe's illustrated novel Barlowe's Inferno, and was set to be done entirely with computer animation. Another film they would have made was The Little Beauty King, an adult animated film directed by Steve Oedekerk, which would have been a satire of the films from the Disney Renaissance. It would predate Shrek (2001).

Fox Animation Studios' only other productions were the PBS television series Adventures from the Book of Virtues (1996–2000) and the direct-to-video spin-off to Anastasia, Bartok the Magnificent (1999), along with sub-contract work for DreamWorks Animation's The Prince of Egypt (1998). Out of all the television shows, sequels and spin-offs based on Don Bluth properties, Bartok was the only one to actually have Bluth and Goldman as directors.

The former headquarters for the studio sat unused and abandoned until it was demolished in 2017. An apartment complex was later built on the site.

Filmography

Animation service

Cancelled projects

See also 
 Sullivan Bluth Studios
 20th Century Animation
 Blue Sky Studios
 20th Television Animation
 Walt Disney Animation Studios
 Pixar
 Disneytoon Studios
 List of animated feature films of the 1990s
 List of 20th Century Studios theatrical animated feature films

References 

1994 establishments in Arizona
2000 disestablishments in Arizona
American animation studios
American companies established in 1994
American companies disestablished in 2000
20th Century Studios
Films directed
Companies based in Phoenix, Arizona
Mass media companies established in 1994
Mass media companies disestablished in 2000
Fox animation